William D. "Bill" Cubbedge (born September 5, 1951, in Bainbridge, Ohio) is an American race horse owner and breeder.

Biography
Bill Cubbedge, along with partner Michael Lauffer, owned the Thoroughbred racehorse Shackleford. Trained by Dale Romans, their horse ran fourth in the 2011 Kentucky Derby then came back to win the second leg of the U.S. Triple Crown series, the Preakness Stakes. Shackleford went on to win the Grade 1 Metropolitan Handicap in 2012.

References

1951 births
American racehorse owners and breeders
Sportspeople from Cleveland
Living people